Lassie's Rescue Rangers is an animated TV show produced by Filmation and featuring Lassie, running from 1972 to 1973. The hour-long pilot, Lassie and the Spirit of Thunder Mountain, was part of The ABC Saturday Superstar Movie.

Summary
In the series, Lassie the collie lives near Thunder Mountain with the Turner family. Ranger Ben Turner (voiced by Ted Knight) works with wife Laura (voiced by Jane Webb) and children Susan (voiced by Jane Webb), Jackie (voiced by Lane Scheimer), and Ben Jr. (voiced by Keith Sutherland) as the Forest Force, a ranger-rescue team that protects Thunder Mountain National Park. Lassie is the leader of the Rescue Rangers, a group of wild animals living in the park, working alongside the Turners to help protect the environment and keep it safe for visitors.

The Rescue Rangers were eight animals including Groucho the owl, Toothless the mountain lion, Musty the skunk, and Robbie the raccoon. Also helping the Forest Force was Gene Fox, a Native American, who was Ben Jr.'s, Jackie's and Susan's friend. Lassie herself and Toothless are the only animals who appeared in every episode.  Also, Laura Turner was absent from "Lassie's Special Assignment," "The Impostors," and "The Sunken Galleon."

Reception
The sixteen-episode season was not well received. Lassie's trainer, Rudd Weatherwax, said, "That's not Lassie. That's trash." The National Association of Broadcasters agreed: "The manufacturers of this rubbish have incorporated violence, crime and stupidity into what is probably the worst show for children of the season."

Episode list

References

External links

1972 American television series debuts
1973 American television series endings
1970s American animated television series
American Broadcasting Company original programming
American children's animated adventure television series
Animated television series about dogs
English-language television shows
Lassie television series
Television series by Filmation
Television series by Universal Television
Television shows directed by Hal Sutherland